Plasmodium inui is a species of parasite, one of the species of simian Plasmodium that cause malaria in Old World monkeys.

History
This species was described in 1907 by Halberstaedter and von Prowazek.

Epidemiology 
This species is found in China and also the Celebes, Indonesia, Malaysia and the Philippines.

Phylogenetics 
It is closely related to other 'quartan' Plasmodium species, including Plasmodium coatneyi, Plasmodium cynomolgi, Plasmodium fragile, Plasmodium fieldi, Plasmodium hylobati, Plasmodium simiovale and  Plasmodium vivax (which is a 'tertian' Plasmodium species).

Life cycle 
The life cycle is typical of a species of the genus Plasmodium.

It has a 72-hour (or quartan) periodicity.

Salivary gland sporozoites appear in Anopheles dirus 13 days post feeding.

The prepatent period in the vertebrate host is 8 days.

Vectors 
 Anopheles dirus

Hosts 
 Assamese macaques (Macaca assamensis)
 long tailed macaques (Macaca fascicularis)

References 

inui
Parasites of primates